iGlue is an experimental database with detailed search options, containing entities and information editing tool. It organizes interrelated images, videos, individuals, institutions, objects, websites, geographical locations into cohesive data structures.

The most important components of iGlue system are: the flexible database which contains semantic elements, and entities, and their relational connections.

In4 Kft. was established in August 2007 as a company specialised in the development of online applications based on university researches, with the participation of young university researchers and of the Power of the Dream Ventures, as financial investor.

References

External links
 

Semantic Web
Computational linguistics
Natural language processing